Council High School is a public high school located in Council, Virginia in Buchanan County, Virginia. It is part of the Buchanan County Public Schools system.  Athletic teams compete in the Virginia High School League and is a member of the Black Diamond District in Region D.

Mission statement
The mission of Council High School is to provide educational opportunities for all students in a safe environment that promotes academic excellence, mutual respect, and physical development.  The Council High School staff joins parents and the community in supporting students in developing skills to become independent and responsible adults who can adapt to a complex and rapidly changing world.

Extracurricular activities

Basketball
Council High School's Boys Basketball team were 2001 state champions.  The team was also awarded the Marshall Johnson Sportsmanship award for Basketball for the 2000–2001 season.

Softball
Council was the 1982 and 1984 state championship team.

Robotics
Council High School's FIRST Tech Challenge team, Team 4417 (The Venom), was created in 2010 with the help of sponsor Ms. Amanda Dorton. The team advanced to the state competition twice and also received the Think Award. The team colors are Black, Pink, & Silver. The team gives special thanks to Terra Tech Engineering of Grundy, Virginia and FTC team 2940 of Riverview Elementary/Middle School from Grundy, Virginia.

SOL scores

Grade 8:

Passing rate for Science students;
The state average for Science was 89% in 2007.
90% (2007)
77% (2006)
74% (2005)
56% (2004)

References

External links
 Council High School

Schools in Buchanan County, Virginia
Public high schools in Virginia
Educational institutions established in 1965
1965 establishments in Virginia